True Sound of the Underground is the third studio album by Swedish heavy metal band Sister Sin, released through Victory Records on 13 May 2010.

Track listing

Personnel 
Liv Jagrell - Vocals 
Jimmy Hiltula - Guitar 
Strandh - Bass
Dave Sundberg - Drums

References 

2010 albums
Sister Sin albums
Victory Records albums